Pas de Morgins (el. 1369 m.) is a high mountain pass in the Alps between the canton of Valais in Switzerland and France. It is located at the top of the Val de Morgins, which turns off  the Val d'Illiez at Troistorrents.

The road through the Val de Morgins is marked by a series of hairpin curves.

It connects Monthey and Abondance.

Tour de France
Pas de Morgins has been used a total of eight times since its debut in the 1977 Tour de France. Seven times the climb was categorized and once the climb was uncategorized.

See also
 List of highest paved roads in Europe
 List of mountain passes
List of the highest Swiss passes

References

Mountain passes of Auvergne-Rhône-Alpes
Mountain passes of Switzerland
Mountain passes of the Alps
Mountain passes of Valais
France–Switzerland border crossings